Togbe Agorkoli (Eʋegbe: Togbe Agɔ Akɔli) was the mythical ruler of Notsie, a town in modern Togo. During his rule, the Ewe peoples in what are now Ghana and Togo escaped from Notsie to their present lands. He ruled the Ewe with an iron fist and had any person who spoke against him put on trial and inevitably found guilty, which meant a death sentence. When the Ewe people decided they did not want to suffer under his rule, they sought a very famous and powerful hunter known as Togbe Tsali. Tsali agreed to hear their pleas. During a festive holiday, it is said that he enchanted the drums to put all the royals and Togbe Agorkoli to sleep.  He then mobilized the citizens to pass through a crevice made in a thick mud wall, resulting in the Ewe people's freedom from Notsie. While escaping, Tsali convinced the citizens to walk backwards, confusing their pursuers.

After the exodus, the Ewe were led by the wise man called Torgbui Ewenya.  The word Ewe was taken from their formal leader Torgbui Ewenya.

References

Legendary Togolese people